Louis Rendu (December 9, 1789 in Meyrin – August 28, 1859) was French Roman Catholic bishop of Annecy and a scientist. 

He was the author of Theorie des glaciers de la Savoie, an important book on the mechanisms of glacial motion. The Rendu Glacier, Alaska, U.S. and Mount Rendu, Antarctica are named for him.

He was a founding member of the Académie des sciences, belles-lettres et arts de Savoie. The following are a few of his ethnological and religious-themed works:
 De l'influence des Moeurs sur les Lois, et de l'influence des Lois sur les Moeurs, 1833
 Moeurs et coutumes de la Savoie du Nord au XIXe siècle, 1845
 Lettre à S. M. le Roi de Prusse (sur la situation religieuse de l'Europe), 1848
 Des efforts du protestantisme, 1855.

See also
List of Roman Catholic scientist-clerics

References

External links
Bishop Rendu at Catholic Hierarchy
Mount Rendu

French physicists
French glaciologists
Catholic clergy scientists
1789 births
1859 deaths